Established in 1950, The East Africa rugby union team is a multi-national rugby union team drawing players from Kenya, Uganda and Tanzania, though the vast majority of these came from Kenya which has traditionally been the strongest rugby playing nation in the region. The team has played against incoming international, representative and club touring sides and it conducted seven tours between 1954 and 1982.

Though East Africa do play under the Tuskers nickname, it is used exclusively when they are on tour; for all matches played at home they are referred to as East Africa.  This tradition has come into being because the team had existed for five years by the time of the first external tour in 1954 when the touring side adopted the Tuskers moniker, as have all subsequent tours.

For 30 years the team lay dormant, though the Rugby Football Union of East Africa (RFUEA) continued to exist as the governing body of rugby within the three countries, until (on 9 July 2011 at an event at the RFUEA Ground) the team was re-launched by Mwangi Muthee (Chairman of the Kenya Rugby Football Union), William Blick (President of the Uganda Rugby Union), George Kariuki (Rugby Football Union of East Africa) and John Lloyd (Rugby Patrons Society).  The team played its first fixture in almost exactly 30 years against England Counties XV at the RFUEA grounds in early June 2012.

Early history
The first union in British East Africa was the Rugby Football Union of Kenya (RFU-K), founded in August 1921; it was responsible for the administration of the game throughout Kenya, Uganda and Tanganyika which it carried out through various district sub-unions throughout the region.  Several universities and Royal Navy ships sent teams to tour East Africa during this period.  The Combined South African Universities toured in 1929 and in 1935 Danie Craven captained Stellenbosch University on a tour of the region; though none of these encounters included a match against a representative East Africa team.

The first representative team called East Africa are recorded facing the Cape Town University team that toured the region in late 1949 early 1950. Three matches were played in January 1950, East Africa losing each encounter.  At this time, the East Africa team represented the colonies of British East Africa (Kenya Colony, Tanganyika and Uganda Protectorate) and the players were predominantly white settlers. (it was not until the 1960s that rugby's popularity spread and indigenous players started to take up the game; with time the East African team has seen a commensurate increase in the numbers of black players being selected).

In 1953 the Rugby Football Union of East Africa (RFUEA) was created in order to take over the mantle as the umbrella organisation for rugby in the region.  The creation of the RFUEA allowed for the formation of the Tanganyika Rugby Football Union (TRFU) in 1954 and Uganda Rugby Football Union (URFU) in 1955. Each of these were essentially a sub-union of the RFUEA much as the district unions in Kenya were, so the RFU-K was dissolved in 1956 allowing the already existing district unions to deal directly with the RFUEA.

The formation of the RFUEA was just in time for the East Africa representative side's first tour, the First Tuskers Tour of the Copperbelt in 1954.  It also gave the team slightly more official status though little, if anything, had changed with regard to the management of the team.  Tuskers tours to the Copperbelt became somewhat of a tradition, six of the eight Tuskers tours have been to this rugby stronghold in southern Africa; a region that can provide an appropriate level of opposition and at a distance that does not strain the purse-strings of the players and unions alike.  The only Tuskers tours not to the Copperbelt were toEngland (1966) and Ireland (1972).

A year after the first tour, East Africa faced the British Lions in the first game played at the recently constructed headquarters of East African rugby, the RFUEA Ground and during the next six years welcomed other touring sides from the United Kingdom and South Africa including the Barbarians and South Africa and several prestigious university and military teams.

The Second Tuskers Tour took place in 1962 and again East Africa's first game at home after returning from a tour was against the British Lions.  Between 1963 and 1966 several clubs and universities toured East Africa and played against the full representative side including, in 1964, Wales.  Tours from South Africa were no longer welcomed as Kenya, Tanzania and Uganda were participating in the boycott protesting the apartheid regime in that country.

In the six years between the Third (1966) and Fourth (1972) Tuskers tours fifteen high-profile clubs from the United Kingdom and the Irish Republic toured the region and played matches against East Africa, including Richmond FC, Blackheath FC, Harlequins FC and Blackrock College RFC, several touring twice in those years so enamoured were they by the region and their welcome.  The fixtures played by East Africa at this time demonstrate clearly that outgoing tours create contacts and the desire amongst foreign clubs to come to East Africa and the converse also, incoming tours then generate invitations to conduct external visits.

After the fifth Tuskers tour there was only one more British club to visit East Africa because the Rugby Football Union refused to participate in the anti-apartheid boycott of South Africa, as a result clubs administered by the RFU were no longer welcome.  It is during this period that East Africa saw an increase in touring sides from France (including ACBB, Club Sportif Municipal (CSM) Clamart and ASCO ONERA), Italy (Including Rugby Roma Olimpic), Argentina (Old Georgians and various islands in the Indian Ocean (Réunion and Mauritius).

Major Internationals
When the British Lions went to South Africa for their 1955 and 1962 tours, they played East Africa in Nairobi on the return legs of their journeys. The Lions won both of these games, 39-12 and 50–0 respectively. The 1955 game was East Africa's first international and also saw the official opening of the team's home stadium, the RFUEA Ground, then called the Ngong Road Ground.

In 1958, East Africa hosted the Barbarians on their first tour of Africa. The Barbarians, managed by Brigadier Glyn Hughes and captained by Scotland's Jim Greenwood, took in six matches, the first five all played in South Africa, but the final match of the tour was against East Africa.  The game was played on 28 May, with the Barbarians winning 58–12, Tony O'Reilly scoring seven tries.

East Africa would also play against South Africa in 1961 (losing 39–0), and Wales on their 1964 tour of Africa. Wales' game, held at the RFUEA Ground, Nairobi, on 12 May 1964, was the first time that they had played a match outside of Europe and therefore also their first in the Southern Hemisphere, albeit a mere hundred miles from the Equator. Wales won the match, 26–8.

Prior to the introduction of standard numbering systems, many teams would wear numbers (or in the case of Bristol RFC and Leicester FC, letters) in a different order to that known today.  The first set of East African jerseys was numbered from fullback (1) to scrum-half (7) followed by looshead prop (8) to Number-8 (15).  It must also be remembered that prior to the innovation, by Sherborne School, in the 1960s of using the hooker to throw the ball into the line-out, this was the job of the winger.  Thus there are photos of East African matches with the unusual combination of a winger, numbered 2 or 5, throwing in to a line of eight forwards, numbered 8 to 15.

British Lions 1955

Five and a half years after their first match against the University of Cape Town, East Africa played their first international match against the British Lions, as they returned home from their 1955 tour of South Africa.

The Rugby Football Union of East Africa (RFUEA) took the opportunity of the 1955 match to invite the Lions manager (J.A.E. Siggins) to officially open their newly built national stadium, the RFUEA Ground (then called the Ngong Road Ground) prior to kick-off.  The capacity crowd of 6000 was treated to a magnificent display of running handling rugby that had characterised the tourists' games in South Africa.

According to the match programme, East Africa fielded seven players who were winning their first cap, Brodziak, Chambers, Darroch, MacLean, Meintjes, Tippett and Wheeler.  In addition East Africa selected two reserves and the Lions one; although substitutions were not allowed it was usual to select reserves at this time in case a player did not arrive on time or was unable to start the match.  The match programme also states that Frank Sykes (Northampton & ), Robin Roe (Lansdowne & ) and Tom Reid (Garryowen & ) had been selected to play this match, but the Lions' archives suggest that ultimately they did not.  It appears that the reserve Bryn Meredith and Billy Williams (who had been assigned as the Lions touch-judge) were called upon to start in place of Roe and R.H. Williams while D.G.S. Baker was required to fill in for Sykes.  East Africa took the field as advertised in the programme.

One of the contemporary match reports was written by Tony Coxall, a 13-year-old pupil from Arusha School in Tanzania who attended the match as part of a school trip in which twenty boys undertook the five-and-a-half-hour,  journey to Nairobi in a 1.5 ton lorry.  In this report it is stated that the Lions scored two tries before East Africa answered with a penalty and that at half time the score was 6-19.  It also states that the seats cost 1 shilling each and that the crowd were entertained by the band of the Royal Irish Fusiliers at half-time.

As was usual for touring teams visiting East Africa during the 1950s, 1960s and 1970s, the Lions were given private hospitality as opposed to staying in hotels. Cliff Morgan, Haydn Morris and Gareth Griffiths (all players with Cardiff RFC) stayed with Mr. and Mrs. Arthur "Pat" Bryant, who had played for Cardiff prior to World War I, and who was an official of the East African Rugby Union.  He had refereed for the RFUEA (in his blue and black Cardiff jersey) until his retirement at about 63 years of age.  The tourists also encountered another former Cardiff player from the 1940s, Captain Howell Loveluck who was in Kenya as chaplain to the British Forces stationed there at the time of the Mau Mau Uprising.

There is a frequently repeated urban legend  that Idi Amin (later to become the infamous military dictator of Uganda) was selected as a replacement by East Africa for their match against the 1955 British Lions.  The story is entirely unfounded, he does not appear on the team list or in the team photograph and replacements were first introduced into international rugby 13 years after this event is supposed to have taken place. Mike Gibson of Ireland is generally recognised as being the first ever replacement in a rugby union match (he came on for the injured Barry John during the first test in Pretoria on the 1968 British Lions tour to South Africa).  The first replacement for East Africa was Douglas "Dougie" Hamilton who came on in the 1968 match versus Queen's University (Belfast) R.F.C.

Barbarian F.C. 1958

The Barbarians, managed by Brigadier HL Glyn-Hughes and H Waddell, had just completed a successful tour of South Africa and stopped off in Nairobi on their way home.  Members of this team who had previously visited Nairobi with the 1955 Lions were RH Williams, AJF O'Reilly, REG Jeeps, HF McLeod, JT Greenwood, CI Morgan, AR Smith and AC Pedlow.  RH Davies had previously toured with the 1957 Combined (Oxford and Cambridge) Universities side.

The match was played before a capacity crowd in the late afternoon to early evening on a Wednesday; the papers reported that the colony's Legislative Council (Legco.) had adjourned early that day before cryptically referring to the Barbarian game later in the same paragraph by way of an oblique explanation. The visitors playing champagne rugby in the highest traditions of their club.  Tony O'Reilly scored seven tries, no doubt making up for the fact that he had been injured and unable to play when he had come to Nairobi with the Lions three years earlier.  East Africa's first try was scored by RN Angus of Kenya Harlequins, the first scored by East Africa on their Ngong Road ground.

Springboks 1961
In 1960–61, the Springboks undertook a four-month tour of the United Kingdom and France, winning all their 43 matches except for a 0–0 draw against France and a 6–0 defeat by the Barbarians at Cardiff in what is often inaccurately listed as the final match of that tour.  They left London on Wednesday February 22 by air, landing in Nairobi for a four-day stopover in Kenya on their way back to Johannesburg and, on Saturday 25 February 1961, they played East Africa.  This was the only meeting between these teams, quite possibly the first match between South Africa and another African "nation", but unequivocally the true last match of the tour.

The final score was 39–0, the half-time score having been 15–0 with South Africa piling on a further 21 points within a quarter of an hour of the beginning of the second half, though the flood gates were closed for the rest of the match with the Springboks then only scoring once more.  Johannes "Hannes" Botha (a flanker) and Gideon "Giepie" Wentzel (a full-back) played out of position.

British Lions 1962
Almost exactly seven years after hosting the 1955 Lions, East Africa faced the Lions again on the same ground, this time as they were returning from their 1962 tour to South Africa.  At half time the score was 0 – 29

Wales 1964
In 1964 the Welsh national team undertook their first overseas tour, a five-match tour of Africa. They left London on Sunday May 10 flying to Nairobi, arriving on Monday morning. They played their first ever match outside Europe (and thus their first match in the Southern Hemisphere) against East Africa on Tuesday May 12, winning 26–8, before flying to Cape Town on Wednesday.

Welsh captain Clive Rowlands dictated the patterns of play and orchestrated many of the fine Welsh moves. The Welsh tries were great efforts, especially Dewi Bebb's who snatched a chance from a lineout three yards from the line and dived over before the opposition could lay a finger on him. The East African team fought valiantly and often caused the visitors defence problems with strong surging runs; their star player was Eric Weaver a Welshman serving in Nairobi with the RAF, he had previously played professional football with Swindon town. The Welsh fly-half in this match (Marsden Young) had not been – and was not subsequently – capped by Wales.  As this match was not regarded as a full test by the Welsh Union so this player does not appear on the List of Wales national rugby union players.

The remaining four matches of the tour were in South Africa, who were celebrating the 75th anniversary of the South African Rugby Board.  The first of these was played on May 19 against Boland at Wellington which they won 17–6. The test-match against South Africa, played at King's Park, Durban on May 23, was lost 3–24. The final two games were played on May 27 and May 30 against Northern Transvaal at Pretoria (lost 9–22) and the Orange Free State at Bloemfontein (won 14–6).

It was the lack of success experienced by the team on this tour that is credited with sparking the Welsh Rugby Union into action, appointing their first national coach and reaping the rewards with their fabled teams of the 1970s.

Tuskers tours

The Tuskers is the nickname of the East Africa rugby union team but it is used exclusively when they are on tour.  In all matches played at home they are referred to as East Africa.  By the time of the first Tuskers tour in 1954, East Africa had played three matches, all against the touring University of Cape Town team from South Africa, and the RFUEA badge had been adopted. When their first tour was being organised a few uncharitable nicknames were suggested for the team and thus the Tuskers moniker was quickly adopted and an appropriate emblem designed.

First Tuskers Copperbelt Tour 1954
The idea of an East African rugby touring team was first broached while the Kenya athletics team was visiting the Northern Rhodesia (now Zambia) in 1953.  The manager of that team was Archie Evans, a member of the Nondescripts RFC in Nairobi and he was able to communicate this proposal to the fledgling Rugby Football Union of East Africa (RFUEA). The tour took several months to organise, the process being hindered by the postal delays between the RFUEA, the Northern Rhodesian Rugby Union and its subsidiary, the Northern Rhodesian Congo Border Rugby Union.  It was eventually decided that the latter of these would host the tour and permissions were sought from the respective governing bodies (the South African Rugby Board for Rhodesia and the Rugby Football Union in London for East Africa).

The delays during the planning meant that there was no time to stage trials. Instead the recently played first ever match between Kenya and Tanganyika was used to select the majority of the players that were to go on the tour. Arrangements were finalised just two weeks before departure; unfortunately one of the best players East Africa ever produced, A.I. McLean, was unable to take part as the hastily arranged tour coincided with his wedding.  Most of the organisational work had been carried out by C.F. Schermbrucker (acting President of the RFUEA), Owen Wheeler (Hon Secretary RFUEA) and Mr. R.E. Luyt who had previously lived and played rugby in the Copperbelt.

The team, managed by A.K. Fyfe and Andrew G. Clark,  left by air from Nairobi West on 17 August 1954.
Played 8 matches, won 7 and lost 1 (to the Copperbelt XV).

Second Tuskers Copperbelt Tour 1962

In 1962 the Tuskers, captained By Chris Young, toured the Copperbelt region of Northern Rhodesia (now Zambia) for the second time.  They played seven matches winning two; those played against Ndola and Mufulira.

Third Tuskers England tour 1966

September 1966, Toured England. Captain was Brian Granville-Ross, Manager was Balf Laing, Assistant Manager was Peter Griffiths.

Played against Richmond F.C., Blackheath F.C., Anti-Assassins, Wilmslow RUFC, Vale of Lune RUFC, Harlequin F.C. and Fylde.  All matches were lost.

Fourth Tuskers Ireland Tour 1972

This tour took place in September 1972. The team played eight matches winning three.

Fifth Tuskers Zambia Tour 1975

Zambia v East Africa 1975

Sixth Tuskers Zambia Tour 1979
At the culmination of the 1978 tour to Zambia by Kenya an invitation was issued to the Tuskers to tour Zambia in 1979 to celebrate the 25th anniversary of the First Tuskers Tour.  The second ever match between East Africa and Zambia took place on this tour with East Africa winning 21–13, thus evening up the record.  Jackson Omaido (Mean Machine) was tour Captain.

Seventh Tuskers Zambia and Zimbabwe Tour 1982
The entire squad consisted of Kenyan players with the exception of David Nsubuga of Uganda. Rob Bertram, then chairman of Nondescripts RFC, was the tour manager and Jackson Omaido (Harlequins) was the Captain. Rodney Evans (Nondescripts) was player-coach and took over the captain's role with Omaido injured ahead of the test against Zimbabwe.

List of Matches
All matches played at RFUEA Ground (Nairobi, Kenya) except for those on a Tuskers tour (indicated by a grey background).

Notable personalities
The first black player to represent East Africa was J.K. "Ted" Kabetu (Mombasa Sports Club), who played on the wing against Richmond F.C. in 1972: he was also the first black rugby player at Mombasa Sports Club and, in 1974, the first black player to captain a rugby club in East Africa.  Another Nairobi School former pupil, Chris Onsotti (then of Impala R.F.C., later of Mwamba R.F.C.) was the first black player to represent East Africa as a forward, playing prop on the Fourth Tuskers tour of Ireland 1972.

There is a frequently repeated urban myth that Idi Amin was selected as a replacement by the team for their 1955 match against the British Lions, while still a sergeant in the King's African Rifles. While Amin did play club rugby at the time, he does not appear in the team photograph or on the official team list.

Playing record

Test Matches

Non-test Matches

Participating Unions
The members of this team are drawn from players who qualify to be selected for:
 Kenya national rugby union team
 Tanzania national rugby union team
 Uganda national rugby union team

See also
 East Africa cricket team

Notes

a.  In the 1960s, rugby teams started separating backs and forwards in practice as the game had evolved such that their functions and tactics became increasingly disconnected.  The Sherborne School team (under their coaches M.M. Walford and H.F.W. Holmes) began to use the hooker to throw the ball in to line-outs at practice rather than disrupt the rehearsal of moves by the backs.  It followed logically that having practiced the technique the hooker should throw in the ball during matches, particularly as the opposition would be required to reduce their line-out to seven players in order to match the throwing teams numbers.  This tactic was taken to Oxford University by the Sherborne hooker, D.M. Barry, from where it has spread to become accepted practise throughout the world.

b.  The Evans family has had a great influence on the development of rugby in East Africa, but Dicky Evans, though he shares the same surname and was, like them, a member of Nondescripts RFC, is not part of this family.  Dicky was later to become owner and then president of the Cornish Pirates rugby team in the United Kingdom.

c.  East Africa's original jerseys from the 1950s and early 1960s were numbered from fullback (1) to scrum-half (7) followed by looshead prop (8) to Number-8 (15).

References
 
 Cotton, Fran (Ed.) (1984) The Book of Rugby Disasters & Bizarre Records. Compiled by Chris Rhys. London. Century Publishing.

Sources
 East Africa vs Combined Services 5 May 1962

International rugby union teams
Multinational rugby union teams
Former national rugby union teams
Rugby union in East Africa